Candoshi-Shapra (also known as Candoshi, Candoxi, Kandoshi, and Murato) is an indigenous American language isolate, spoken by several thousand people in western South America along the Chapuli, Huitoyacu, Pastaza, and Morona river valleys. There are two dialects, Chapara (also spelled Shapra) and Kandoashi. It is an official language of Peru, like other native languages in the areas in which they are spoken and are the predominant language in use. Around 88.5 percent of the speakers are bilingual with Spanish. The literacy rate in Candoshi-Shapra is 10 to 30 percent and 15 to 25 percent in the second language Spanish. There is a Candoshi-Shapra dictionary, and grammar rules have been codified.

Classification
Candoshi is not closely related to any living language. It may be related to the extinct and poorly attested language Chirino. Four words of Chirino are mentioned in Relación de la tierra de Jaén (1586), and they resemble words in modern Candoshi. A somewhat longer list of words is given in the same document for Rabona, across the modern border in Ecuador and include some names of plants that resemble Candoshi, but such words can easily be borrowed.

Among modern languages, Loukotka (1968), followed by Tovar (1984), connected Candoshi with Taushiro (Pinche). Kaufman (1994) tentatively proposed a Kandoshi–Omurano–Taushiro language family, with Candoshi the most distant of the trio. However, Kaufman (2007) placed Omurano and Taushiro but not Candoshi in Saparo–Yawan.

David Payne (1981) proposes that Candoshi is related to Jivaroan, which Payne calls Shuar. Together, Shuar and Candoshi make up a putative Shuar-Candoshi family, for which Payne (1981) provides a tentative reconstruction of Proto-Shuar-Candoshi. 

Jolkesky (2016) classifies Candoshi-Shapra as a Macro-Arawakan language.

Language contact
Jolkesky (2016) notes that there are lexical similarities with the Cholon-Hibito, Jivaro, Kawapana, Kechua, Kunza, Mochika, and Pano language families due to contact.

Further reading
Tuggy, J. C. (1966). Vocabulario candoshi de Loreto. (Serie Lingüística Peruana, 2). Yarinacocha: Summer Institute of Linguistics.

References

Alain Fabre. 2005. Diccionario etnolingüístico y guía bibliográfica de los pueblos indígenas sudamericanos: CANDOSHI
Jolkesky, Marcelo. 2016. Estudo arqueo-ecolinguístico das terras tropicais sul-americanas. Brasilia: UnB. PhD Dissertation. Available here.
Payne, David Lawrence. 1981. "Bosquejo fonológico del Proto-Shuar-Candoshi: evidencias para una relación genética." Revista del Museo Nacional 45. 323-377.

External links 

 ELAR Collection: Documentation of Kandozi and Chapra (Candoshi-Shapra) in Loreto, Peru deposited by Simon Overall

Languages of Peru
Indigenous languages of Western Amazonia
Language isolates of South America